George Selway (21 February 1924 – May 1994) was an English actor who had a lengthy career in film and television. He was married to and later separated from English actress Patricia Greene, of The Archers radio serial fame.

Coincidentally, he played a police sergeant in two films starring Hayley Mills: Tiger Bay (1959) and Sky West and Crooked (1966); between which films he played a third, in  House of Mystery (1961 film),

Selected filmography
 The Secret Place (1957)
 Tiger Bay (1959)
 House of Mystery (1961 film) (1961)
 Sky West and Crooked (1966)
 Maroc 7 (1967)
 The Strange Affair (1968)
 Three Sisters (1970)
 Commuter Husbands'' (1972)
TV
Doctor Who: "The Faceless Ones" (1967)

External links
 

1924 births
English male television actors
English male film actors
1994 deaths
20th-century English male actors